Kathe Sandler (born May 11, 1959) is a filmmaker. She won a 1996 Guggenheim Award and two Prized Pieces Awards from the National Black Programming Consortium. She also received two fellowships from New York Foundation for the Arts for filmmaking.

Early life 
Sandler was born in Mexico City, Mexico, to Joan Sandler, former Community Education Director of the Metropolitan Museum of Art, and Alvin Sandler, a painter and graphic artist. She attended American Film Institute's Directing Workshop for Women. Her sister is Eve Sandler.

Career 
Most known for her feature documentary, A Question of Color, Sandler became known for exploring prejudice, racial identity and the color caste system through the lens of the Black community.

Sandler also made a film called Remembering Thelma, which was about the dancer Thelma Hill, debuting at the 1982 New York Film Festival. 

Sandler directed The Friends, a dramatic film based on Rosa Guy's book of the same name.

She is a doctoral student in Women's and Gender Studies at Rutgers University.

Personal life 
On January 7, 1984, she married Luke Charles Harris at the home of Evelyn Neal in Manhattan.

Filmography 
 Finding a Way: New Initiative in Justice for Children
 1982: Remembering Thelma
 1993: A Question of Color
 1996: The Friends
 When and Where We Enter: Stories of Black Feminism

References

External links 
 A Question of Color

1959 births
Living people